Michael James Dahl Stallibrass (born 28 June 1951) is an English businessman and former first-class cricketer.

The son of the minor counties cricketer Jim Stallibrass, he was born in June 1951 at Poltimore, Devon. He later studied at Magdalen College at the University of Oxford. While studying at Oxford he played first-class cricket for Oxford University, making his debut against Warwickshire at Oxford in 1972. He played first-class cricket for Oxford until 1974, making twenty appearances. Playing as a right-arm off break bowler, Stallibrass took 22 wickets at an average of 38.86 runs per wicket. He took one five wicket haul against Lancashire in 1972, taking figures of 5 for 80. As a lower order batsman, he scored 193 runs in his twenty matches for Oxford, at an average of 8.04 and a high score of 24. In addition to playing for Oxford, Stallibrass also made a single appearance for a combined Oxford and Cambridge Universities team against the touring Indians in 1974.

After graduating from Oxford, Stallibrass became an investment banker in the City of London with UBS. He currently sits on the board of HAV Vaccines.

References

External links

1951 births
Living people
People from East Devon District
Alumni of Magdalen College, Oxford
English cricketers
Oxford University cricketers
Oxford and Cambridge Universities cricketers
English businesspeople